Caladenia pendens subsp. talbotii, commonly known as Talbot's spider orchid, is a plant in the orchid family Orchidaceae and is endemic to the south-west of Western Australia. It has a single hairy leaf and one or two white, red and yellow flowers with long drooping petals and sepals and sometimes has a citrus-like scent.

Description
The sepals and petals have long, brown, drooping, thread-like tips. The sides of the labellum curve upwards and have short blunt teeth on their sides and the tip of the labellum curves downwards. There are two rows of cream-coloured, anvil-shaped calli along the centre of the labellum. Flowering occurs from September to mid-October. This subspecies differs from subspecies pendens in having darker coloured sepals and petals, shorter petals and a shorter labellum.

Taxonomy and naming
Caladenia pendens was first described in 2001 by Stephen Hopper and Andrew Phillip Brown and the description was published in Nuytsia. At the same time they described two subspecies, including subspecies talbotii.<ref name=APNI>{{cite web|title=Caladenia pendens subsp. talbotii|url=https://id.biodiversity.org.au/instance/apni/690023|publisher=APNI|accessdate=2 March 2017}}</ref> The subspecies name (talbotii) honours Len Talbot who was one of the first to recognise this subspecies as distinct.

Distribution and habitat
Talbot's spider orchid is found between Beverley and Watheroo in the Jarrah Forest biogeographic region where it grows in wandoo woodland.

ConservationCaladenia pendens subsp. talbotii''  is classified as "not threatened" by the Western Australian Government Department of Parks and Wildlife.

References

pendens
Endemic orchids of Australia
Orchids of Western Australia
Plants described in 2001
Taxa named by Stephen Hopper
Taxa named by Andrew Phillip Brown